Max Mara (Italian [maks 'ma:ra]) is an Italian fashion business. It markets up-market ready-to-wear clothing. It was established in 1951 in Reggio Emilia by Achille Maramotti (7 January 1927 – 12 January 2005). In March 2008, the company had 2,254 stores in 90 countries. It sponsors the Max Mara Art Prize for Women.

History
Achille Maramotti began designing couture clothing in 1947, and officially established the House of Max Mara in 1951. The "Mara" came from his surname, while "Max" referred to Count Max, a local character who was seldom sober but always stylish. Maramotti was one of the first to see that the future of fashion lay in the mass production of designer-quality clothes.  He was also keen to emphasise the brand of Max Mara ahead of the names of individual designers, even though he employed Karl Lagerfeld, Jean-Charles de Castelbajac, Dolce & Gabbana, Narciso Rodriguez and Anne Marie Beretta. The company remains in the hands of the family.

Brands
Max Mara has spawned 35 labels, although Max Mara womenswear, usually stylized as MaxMara, remains the core of the company. Other brands include Sportmax, Sportmax Code, Weekend Max Mara, Marella, Pennyblack, iBlues, MAX&Co. (the trendy, youth division), and Marina Rinaldi. This last, founded in 1980 and named after Achille Maramotti's great grandmother, is one of the best-known: in her obituary of Maramotti for The Independent.

As of July 17, 2013, Jennifer Garner is the first celebrity spokesperson for Max Mara.

Starting in September 2013, the campaign appears in Vogue, Harper's Bazaar, Elle, W, InStyle, The New York Times, and the International Herald Tribune.

Family
Achille Maramotti was born on January 7, 1927, in Reggio Emilia in Italy. Maramotti was educated in Rome and received a law degree from the University of Parma. According to the Forbes Rich List of 2005, Maramotti was one of the world's richest men with a fortune of US$2.1 billion.

He died in Albinea, Italy on January 12, 2005. Maramotti's two sons and daughter, Luigi, Ignazio and Ludovica, followed him into the business; Luigi Maramotti is chairman of the company. After his death, according to Maramotti's will, a large and important collection of contemporary art from Europe and America was made open to the public.

References

External links
 

Max Mara
Clothing brands of Italy
High fashion brands
Design companies established in 1951
Clothing companies established in 1951
Italian companies established in 1951
Eyewear brands of Italy